Mood Muzik 3: The Album is the second studio album by American hip hop artist Joe Budden, released on February 26, 2008, under Amalgam Digital. It is the retailed version of Mood Muzik 3: For Better or for Worse. This album marked Budden's first official studio album in five years following label drama with Def Jam and the shelving of his album The Growth.

Mood Muzik 3: The Album peaked at number 88 on the Billboard Top R&B/Hip-Hop Albums.  The album sold 1,100 copies in its first week.

Track listing

Sample credits
"4 Walls" contains a sample of "Four Walls" as performed by Eddie Holman.
"Un4Given" heavily samples 'Unforgiven' as performed by Metallica.
"Thou Shall Not Fall" heavily samples 'Cry Little Sister' as performed by Gerard McMann.

Charts

References

2008 albums
Joe Budden albums
Amalgam Digital albums
Sequel albums